Sir Eric Gustav Machtig, GCMG, OBE (1889 - 24 July 1973) was a British civil servant. Educated at Trinity College, Cambridge, he entered the civil service as an official in the Colonial Office in 1912; he moved to the Dominions Office in 1930 and he was appointed Permanent Secretary in May 1940; when the office merged with the India and Burma Offices to form the Commonwealth Relations Office in 1947, he became joint Permanent Secretary of the CRO (jointly with Sir Archibald Carter), serving until the end of 1948. Retiring from the civil service in 1949, he became a director of a number of trusts, charities and financial organisations. Both of Machtig's parents were German-born.

References 

1889 births
1973 deaths
British civil servants
Alumni of Trinity College, Cambridge
Knights Grand Cross of the Order of St Michael and St George
Officers of the Order of the British Empire
Civil servants in the Commonwealth Relations Office